Anastasiia Mysnyk (born 19 February 1991) is a Paralympian athlete from Ukraine competing mainly in category F20 shot put events. She won the silver medal in her event at the 2012 Summer Paralympics in London. As well as Paralympic success she has won medals at both World and European level.

Notes

Paralympic athletes of Ukraine
Athletes (track and field) at the 2012 Summer Paralympics
Athletes (track and field) at the 2020 Summer Paralympics
Paralympic silver medalists for Ukraine
Living people
Ukrainian female shot putters
1991 births
People from Znamianka
Medalists at the 2012 Summer Paralympics
Medalists at the 2020 Summer Paralympics
Paralympic medalists in athletics (track and field)
Sportspeople from Kirovohrad Oblast
21st-century Ukrainian women